The 2012–13 Liga Panameña de Fútbol season is the 25th season of top-flight football in Panama. The season began on 20 July 2012 and is scheduled to end in May 2013. Ten teams will complete throughout the entire season.

Teams
Colón C-3 finished in 10th place in the overall table last season and were relegated to the Liga Nacional de Ascenso. Taking their place for this season are the overall champions of last season's Liga Nacional de Ascenso, Río Abajo F.C.

2012 Apertura
The 2012 Apertura is the first tournament of the season. It began on 20 July 2012 and ended on 2 December 2012.

League table

Results

Semi-finals

First leg

Second leg

Arabe Unido won 5-1 on aggregate.

Chepo FC won 3-1 on aggregate.

Final

Top goalscorers

2013 Clausura

League table

Semi-finals

First leg

Second leg

San Francisco won 2-1 on aggregate.

Sporting San Miguelito won 3-2 on aggregate.

Final

Top goalscorers

Aggregate table

References

External links
 https://int.soccerway.com/national/panama/lpf/20122013/clausura/r18636/

Liga Panameña de Fútbol seasons
1
Pan